Darcetina is a genus of moths of the family Noctuidae, containing only a single species, Darcetina sublata, found in Argentina and Brazil. The species was historically misclassified on multiple occasions, but in 2010 was determined to belong to the subfamily Agaristinae.

References

Agaristinae
Monotypic moth genera
Moths of South America